Canariomyces is a genus of fungi in the family Microascaceae.

References

External links 
 Index Fungorum

Microascales